Sandra Romero (born May 24, 1948) is an American politician who served in the Washington House of Representatives from the 22nd district from 1993 to 2005.

References

1948 births
Living people
Democratic Party members of the Washington House of Representatives
Women state legislators in Washington (state)